Highway 342 is a highway in the Canadian province of Saskatchewan. It runs from Highway 42 to Range Road 3183 near Plato and Highway 44.

Highway 342 passes near Beechy, White Bear, Kyle, Lacadena, Tyner, Plato, and Clearwater Lake Regional Park. Highway 342 connects with Highways 647 and 4.

References 

342